Groovemasters is an album by guitarists Preston Reed and Laurence Juber, released in 1999. It is sometimes referred to as Groovemasters, Vol. 1

The success of Groovemasters led to the series of releases by Solid Air pairing various guitarists. Other releases have included Pat Donohue, Phil Keaggy and Davey Johnstone among others.

Track listing
All songs by Laurence Juber and Preston Reed
 "Groovemasters" - 3:33
 "Commotion" - 4:19
 "Shoganai" - 3:31
 "Hurricane" - 5:02
 "Private Dick" - 3:04
 "Bad Attitude" - 4:16
 "Airborne" - 5:00
 "Ricochet" - 4:17
 "Dirty Boy" - 4:24
 "Last Train" - 4:55

Personnel
Preston Reed – guitar
Laurence Juber – guitar
Production notes:
James Jensen – producer, art direction
Grant Headly – engineer
Doug Doyle – mastering
Nathan York – photography
Todd Ellison – art direction

References

External links
Ellison, Todd. Acoustic Musician Magazine. Groovemasters at the Fringe of the Solo Zone

Preston Reed albums
Laurence Juber albums
1997 albums